Only the Wind is a 1961 German crime film directed by Fritz Umgelter and starring Freddy Quinn, Gustav Knuth and Heinz Weiss. The film is a crime drama film set off the western Irish coast.

Cast
 Freddy Quinn as Mike
 Gustav Knuth as Sean O'Connor
 Cordula Trantow as Eileen O'Connor
 Heinz Weiss as Jack Johnston
 Maureen Toal as Mrs. Collins
 Georg Lehn as Nicholas
 Gudrun Schmidt as Dinah
 Helmut Oeser as Roger
 Gottfried Herbe as Tim O'Connor
 Dorit Amann as Celia
  as  Finn
 Hans E. Schons as Paddy MacPhail
 Walter Wilz as Angus

References

External links

1961 films
1961 crime drama films
1960s musical films
German musical films
West German films
1960s German-language films
Films directed by Fritz Umgelter
Films set on islands
Films set in Dublin (city)
Films about fishing
Films set in the Atlantic Ocean
German crime thriller films
1960s German films